Scarlat Callimachi (1773 in Istanbul – 12 December 1821, in Bolu) was Grand Dragoman of the Sublime Porte 1801–1806, Prince of Moldavia between August 24, 1806 – October 26, 1806, August 4, 1807 – June 13, 1810, September 17, 1812 – June 1819 and Prince of Wallachia between February 1821 – June 1821.

A member of the Callimachi family, he was the son of Alexandru Callimachi and Ruxandra Ghica, and married Smaragda Mavrogheni. In 1810, during the Russo-Turkish War, he was imprisoned by the Russians, and taken to Kharkiv. He regained the Moldovan throne in 1812. Scarlat Callimachi adopted new laws and cut taxes for the boyars. He took measures against the plague, maintained upkeep of wood paved streets, supported Gheorghe Asachi's Romanian-language movement, and introduced potatoes to Moldavia.

In 1819 Scarlat Callimachi was taken to Istanbul to be executed after being suspected of collaborating with the Russians. He managed to have the sentence cancelled and in 1821 was appointed by the Porte to be Hospodar of Wallachia. He was Prince de jure a few months in 1821 and was unable to claim the throne. The Greek War of Independence broke out in 1821, and Callimachi died poisoned later that year, under suspicion of being pro-Greek.

References 

 

Rulers of Moldavia
Rulers of Wallachia
Grigore IV
1773 births
1821 deaths
Rulers of Moldavia and Wallachia
Dragomans of the Porte
Scarlat